Acacia praemorsa is a tree or shrub belonging to the genus Acacia and the subgenus Phyllodineae native to southern Australia. It is listed as vulnerable under the Environment Protection and Biodiversity Conservation Act 1999 and is regarded as endangered in South Australia.

Description
Like most species of Acacia it has phyllodes rather than true leaves. They are thick, flat and smooth but become finely longitudinally rugulose as they dry. They have no midrib but have two glands. The spherical flower-heads contain 34 to 58 densely packed bright golden coloured flowers.

Distribution
It is endemic to a small area on the Eyre Peninsula of South Australia where it is found on lower slopes and in steep gullies growing in loamy soils as a part of dense open heathland or open tall shrubland communities.

See also
 List of Acacia species

References

praemorsa
Flora of South Australia
Plants described in 1990